California's 60th State Assembly district is one of 80 California State Assembly districts. It is currently represented by Democrat Sabrina Cervantes of Riverside.

District profile 
The district encompasses the northwestern corner of Riverside County, anchored by the city of Corona. The primarily suburban district is a major gateway between the rest of the Inland Empire and Orange County.

Riverside County – 21.5%
 Corona
 Coronita
 Eastvale
 El Cerrito
 Home Gardens
 Jurupa Valley
 Norco
 Riverside – 40.4%

Other levels of government
The 60th Assembly District is completely contained within .

Election results from statewide races

List of Assembly Members
Due to redistricting, the 60th district has been moved around different parts of the state. The current iteration resulted from the 2011 redistricting by the California Citizens Redistricting Commission.

Election results 1992 - present

2020

2018

2016

2014

2012

2010

2008

2006

2004

2002

2000

1998

1996

1994

1992

See also 
 California State Assembly
 California State Assembly districts
 Districts in California

References

External links 
 District map from the California Citizens Redistricting Commission

60
Assembly
Government in Riverside, California
Corona, California